Glyphostoma cara is a species of sea snail, a marine gastropod mollusk in the family Clathurellidae.

Description

Distribution
This marine species occurs along Sumatra.

References

cara
Gastropods described in 1925